Coleophora dextrella is a moth of the family Coleophoridae. It is found in North America, including Nova Scotia and North Carolina.

The larvae feed on the seeds of Symphyotrichum cordifolium, Symphyotrichum lateriflorum and Symphyotrichum novi-belgii. They create a trivalved, tubular silken case.

References

dextrella
Moths described in 1940
Moths of North America